|}

The Kilternan Stakes, currently known for sponsorship purposes as the Paddy Power Stakes, is a Group 3 flat horse race in Ireland open to thoroughbreds aged three years or older. It is run at Leopardstown over a distance of 1 mile and 4 furlongs (2,414 metres) and it is scheduled to take place each year in September.

History
Leopardstown's Trigo Stakes was temporarily switched to the venue's Irish Champion Stakes meeting in September 1999. It returned to its usual late-October fixture the following year, but a similar race called the Foxrock Stakes was retained in September.

The race became known as the Kilternan Stakes in 2001. It was named after Kilternan, a village located to the south of Leopardstown. For a period the event was classed at Listed level. It was promoted to Group 3 status in 2006. Since 2018 the race has been sponsored by Paddy Power, having previously been sponsored by KPMG. In 2014 it became part of the Irish Champions Weekend fixture and the distance was increased to 1 mile 4 furlongs from its previous distance of 1 mile 2 furlongs.

Records

Most successful horse:
 no horse has won this race more than once

Leading jockey (7 wins):
 Pat Smullen – Muakaad (2001), Sights on Gold (2002), Galileo's Choice (2011), Free Eagle (2014), Fascinating Rock (2015), Zhukova (2016), Eziyra (2017)

Leading trainer (9 wins):
 Aidan O'Brien – Acropolis (2004), Frost Giant (2006), The Bogberry (2008), Poet (2009), Await the Dawn (2010), The United States (2013), Rostropovich (2018), Norway (2019), Tiger Moth (2020) 
 Dermot Weld – Muakaad (2000, 2001), Sights on Gold (2002), Galileo's Choice (2011), Free Eagle (2014), Fascinating Rock (2015), Zhukova (2016), Eziyra (2017), Duke De Sessa (2022)

Winners

See also
 Horse racing in Ireland
 List of Irish flat horse races

References

 Racing Post:

 galopp-sieger.de – Kilternan Stakes.
 horseracingintfed.com – International Federation of Horseracing Authorities – KPMG Enterprise Stakes (2018).
 pedigreequery.com – Kilternan Stakes – Leopardstown.

Flat races in Ireland
Open middle distance horse races
Recurring sporting events established in 2001
Leopardstown Racecourse